The 2014 ICF Canoe Sprint World Championships was held from 6–10 August 2014 in Moscow, Russia.

They were chosen at an ICF board of directors meeting in Budapest on 10 April 2010.

Explanation of events
Canoe sprint competitions are broken up into Canadian canoe (C), an open canoe with a single-blade paddle, or in kayaks (K), a closed canoe with a double-bladed paddle. Each canoe or kayak can hold one person (1), two people (2), or four people (4). When a competition is listed as a C-2 500 m event as an example, it means two people are in a canoe competing at a  distance.

Medal summary

Men
 Non-Olympic classes

Canoe

Kayak

Women
 Non-Olympic classes

Canoe

Kayak

Medal table

Paracanoeing

References

ICF Bidding Questionnaire: 2014 ICF Canoe Sprint World Championships Moscow. – accessed 11 April 2010.

External links
Results
Official website

2014
ICF Canoe Sprint World Championships
ICF Canoe Sprint World Championships
2014
2014 ICF Canoe Sprint World Championships
Canoeing and kayaking competitions in Russia